Abdallah Elias Zaidan (Arabic: الياس عبدالله زيدان) born on March 10, 1963, in Kosaybé, Lebanon) is a Maronite Catholic bishop, or eparch, in the United States. He has served as the third eparch of the Eparchy of Our Lady of Lebanon of Los Angeles since 2013.

Early life and Priesthood
Abdallah Elias Zaidan was born in Kosaybé, Lebanon. He professed perpetual vows as a member of the Congregation of Maronite Lebanese Missionaries on September 26, 1984, and was ordained a priest on July 20, 1986.  As a priest Zaidan served as a school administrator and as a pastor of several parishes, including as rector of Our Lady of Mt. Lebanon-St. Peter Cathedral. He speaks Arabic, English, French, and Spanish.

Eparch of Our Lady of Lebanon of Los Angeles
Pope Francis named Zaidan the Eparch of Our Lady of Lebanon of Los Angeles on July 10, 2013. He was ordained a bishop on September 28, 2013, by Cardinal Bechara Boutros al-Rahi, O.M.M., the Patriarch of Antioch. Eparch-Emeritus Robert Joseph Shaheen and Archeparch Camille Zaidan of the Maronite Catholic Archeparchy of Antelias in Lebanon were the co-consecrators.

See also
 

 Catholic Church hierarchy
 Catholic Church in the United States
 Historical list of the Catholic bishops of the United States
 List of Catholic bishops of the United States
 Lists of patriarchs, archbishops, and bishops

References

External links

Maronite Catholic Eparchy of Our Lady of Lebanon of Los Angeles Official Site
 http://www.gcatholic.org/dioceses/diocese/olle0.htm

Episcopal succession

1963 births
Living people
American Eastern Catholic bishops
Lebanese-American Maronite Catholic bishops
Lebanese Maronites
Clergy from St. Louis
21st-century Maronite Catholic bishops
American Maronites
Lebanese emigrants to the United States
Bishops appointed by Pope Francis